Leonard Michaels (January 2, 1933 – May 10, 2003) was an American writer of short stories, novels, and essays.

Early life and education
Michaels was born in New York City to Jewish parents; his father was born in Poland.  He attended New York University and was awarded a BA degree, and then went on to earn an MA and PhD in English literature from the University of Michigan.  After receiving his doctorate, Leonard Michaels moved to Berkeley, California, where he was to spend most of his adult life and become Professor of English at the University of California.

Literary career
In 1969, Michael's first book was published – Going Places, a collection of short stories.

His follow-up book, another collection of short stories, was I Would Have Saved Them If I Could, published in 1975. It was considered by some as strong as Michaels' debut.
 
Michaels' first novel, released in 1981, was The Men's Club.  It is story-like comedy that simultaneously attacks and celebrates the absurdities of men as they gather in a kind of urban support group.  In 1986, the novel was made into a film, directed by Peter Medak, with the screenplay by Michaels, and starring Roy Scheider, Harvey Keitel, Stockard Channing, Jennifer Jason Leigh and Frank Langella.

Michaels' second and last novel was published in 1992.  Titled Sylvia, it is a fictionalized memoir of his first wife, Sylvia Bloch, who committed suicide.  Sylvia is described in the book as "abnormally bright" but prone to violent rages, "like a madwoman imitating a college student." Sylvia incorporates passages from Michaels' diary, a selection of which was published under the title Time Out of Mind in 1999.

Michaels became a regular contributor to The New Yorker magazine in the 1990s.

Sylvia Bloch
Sylvia Bloch was born 1939 in Switzerland. Her father, Alfred Bloch, born in Gailingen, Germany on 8 August 1904, was a chemist who worked for Fuller Brush. Her mother was Else Sondhelm, born in Dresden, Germany in 1916. The family immigrated to New York in 1939 and lived in Highland Park, New Jersey.

Other information
Michaels was a Professor of English at the University of California, Berkeley.

He took part in anti-Vietnam war protests in the San Francisco Bay area, although he also accepted a description of himself as an 'unpolitical man'.

He is interred at Oakmont Memorial Park, in Lafayette, California.

Michaels had a daughter with his third wife, the poet Brenda Hillman. His son Jesse Michaels (from his second marriage) was the vocalist and primary lyricist in the seminal underground punk rock band Operation Ivy.

Selected publications
Short story collections
 Going Places (1969)
 I Would Have Saved Them If I Could (1975)
 Shuffle (1990)
 A Girl With a Monkey: New and Selected Stories (2000)
 The Collected Stories  (2007)
 The Nachman Stories  (2017)

Novels
 The Men's Club (1981) (filmed in 1986)
 Sylvia (1992)

Essays
 To Feel These Things (2000)
 The Essays of Leonard Michaels  2009, 

Diary
 Time Out of Mind (1999)

Others
 A Cat (1995)

References

External links
 
 The Improbable Moralist Both an appreciation of his art and review of The Collected Stories by Phillip Lopate; published in The Nation on-line June 21, 2007 (July 9, 2007 issue)
 Leonard Michaels – let us not forget him review of The Collected Stories, by Paul Wilner. This piece appeared July 1, 2007 at SF Gate.com. The review also extends into a backlog of reflection about Michaels' Sylvia and an essay on Michaels' called Difficult Friends in Wendy Lesser's Room For Doubt.
 To Live in a Culture: Leonard Michaels' Sylvia and The Collected Stories piece by Nora Griffin at The Brooklyn Rail
 Interview: Wyatt Mason on Leonard Michaels at Harper's
 Obituary of the University of California
  – A reading of Michaels' story "Cryptology".
 

1933 births
2003 deaths
20th-century American novelists
American male novelists
American male screenwriters
Jewish American novelists
Writers from Berkeley, California
University of California, Berkeley faculty
Burials in Contra Costa County, California
American male short story writers
University of Michigan alumni
20th-century American short story writers
20th-century American male writers
Screenwriters from California
20th-century American screenwriters
20th-century American Jews
21st-century American Jews